Cambridge University Press & Assessment is a non-teaching department of the University of Cambridge. It was formed in August 2021, when the University of Cambridge merged its global academic research and education publisher Cambridge University Press and worldwide assessment arm University of Cambridge Local Examinations Syndicate (UCLES, also known as Cambridge Assessment).

The organisation operates in more than 170 countries around the world and has offices in 50 locations, with its headquarters in Cambridge, England.

Being part of the University of Cambridge gives Cambridge University Press & Assessment a non-profit status. It is led by Chief Executive Peter Andrew Jestyn Phillips who  reports to the Vice-Chancellor of the university.

Organisation structure 
Cambridge University Press & Assessment's operations include:

 Cambridge Assessment English
 Cambridge Assessment International Education
 Cambridge University Press
 OCR (Oxford, Cambridge and Royal Society of Arts exam board)

In January 2022 it announced its education team, formed of the two teams from its legacy organisations, will be split into one team that focuses on the UK education sector and one that focuses on international education.

Products and services 

 research that underpins all Cambridge qualifications, learning materials and programmes
 OCR offers GCSEs, A levels, Cambridge Technicals, Cambridge Nationals and a wide range of other vocational qualifications within the United Kingdom.
 Cambridge Assessment International Education provides assessment services to many governments and supplies International GCSEs, A and AS levels and business qualifications, primarily outside the United Kingdom. 
 Cambridge Assessment English offers a range of English language learning materials and qualifications.
 Cambridge Assessment Admissions Testing provides admissions tests for universities including the University of Cambridge and University of Oxford.
 Cambridge Assessment Network provides professional development to the assessment community
 Cambridge University Press publishes 
 research books and journals in science, technology, medicine, humanities, and the social sciences. See List of Cambridge University Press book series and List of Cambridge University Press journals
 Bibles, and is one of only two publishers entitled to publish the Book of Common Prayer and the King James Version of the Bible in England.
 English language teaching courses and resources for learners of all ages around the world.
 educational products, services and software for primary, secondary and international schools.

Cambridge University Press & Assessment also works in partnership with Cambridge University on mathematics curriculum (Cambridge Maths) and on supporting education at a national level (Cambridge Partnership for Education).

Governance 
The organisation is governed by a ‘Syndicate’ (Press & Assessment Syndicate) of 18 senior members of the University of Cambridge. Day-to-day management of the business is delegated by the Syndicate to the Cambridge University Press & Assessment's Chief Executive, currently Peter Andrew Jestyn Phillips, working with its executive board. Updates from the syndicate are published by the official newspaper of the University of Cambridge, The Reporter.

History 
Cambridge University Press & Assessment was formed on 1 August 2021. Her Majesty Queen Elizabeth II approved amendments to University of Cambridge Statutes, which formally recognised the operational merger of Cambridge Assessment and Cambridge University Press, presented at a Privy Council meeting on 15 December 2021.  The main changes to Statute J were to replace references to the University Press with references to the merged entity under the title of the Press and Assessment Department, and to update the name of the Press Syndicate to the Press & Assessment Syndicate.

The two founding organisations have an entwined history, since December 1858 when Cambridge University Press first printed exam papers for UCLES.

At the 2022 Education World Forum, Cambridge University Press & Assessment Chief Executive Peter Andrew Jestyn Phillips warned of the impact of the COVID-19 pandemic on students' mental health, urging the gathering of education ministers and leaders to "put wellbeing at the heart of everything we do."

External links 
 Official website 
 University of Cambridge website 
 Cambridge Assessment Network & Research website  
 Cambridge Assessment International website  
 OCR website   
 Cambridge Assessment English website   
 Cambridge Maths website   
 Cambridge Partnership for Education website

External references 

Press
Book publishing companies of the United Kingdom
University presses of the United Kingdom
Companies based in Cambridge
 
 
Cambridge Assessment
Student assessment and evaluation
2021 establishments in England
Organizations established in 2021